The Woman of the Apocalypse (or the woman clothed with the sun, ;) is a figure, traditionally believed to be the Virgin Mary, described in Chapter 12 of the Book of Revelation (written c. AD 95).

The woman gives birth to a male child who is threatened by a dragon, identified as the Devil and Satan, who intends to devour the child as soon as he is born. When the child is taken to heaven, the woman flees on eagle’s wings into the wilderness at a "place prepared of God" for 1,260 days.  This leads to a "War in Heaven" in which the angels cast out the dragon. The dragon attacks the woman, but the woman escapes on her wings for "a time, times and a time and a half"  i.e. 1,260 days (the duration of each of three periods). The dragon then attacks her again with a flood of water from his mouth, which is subsequently swallowed by earth. Frustrated, the dragon initiates war on "the remnant of her seed", identified as the righteous followers of Christ.
The Woman of the Apocalypse is widely identified as the Virgin Mary. This interpretation is held by some commentators of the ancient Church as well as in the medieval and modern Catholic Church. This view does not negate the alternative interpretation of the Woman representing the Church, as in Catholic teaching, Mary is both the Mother of God and the Mother of the Church. Some Catholic commentaries, such as Thomas Haydock's Catholic Bible Commentary (1859), allow for the interpretation of the woman as either the Church or Mary. The commentary of the New American Bible (the official Catholic Bible for America) states that "The woman adorned with the sun, the moon, and the stars (images taken from Genesis 37:9–10) symbolizes God’s people in the Old and the New Testament. The Israel of old gave birth to the Messiah (Rev 12:5) and then became the new Israel, the church, which suffers persecution by the dragon (Rev. 12:6, 13–17); cf. Is. 50:1; 66:7; Jer. 50:12."

In Protestant churches, including Reformed Churches and the Evangelical Movement, the Woman of the Apocalypse tends to be seen as the Church or Israel.

Narrative
The text describes "a woman clothed with the sun, and the moon under her feet, and upon her head a crown of twelve stars" (12:1).
The woman is pregnant and about to give birth, "travailing in birth, and pained to be delivered" (12:2).

Then there is "a great red dragon, having seven heads and ten horns, and seven crowns upon his heads" (12:3) who is about to "devour her child as soon as it was born" (12:4). But her child is "caught up unto God" (12:5), and the woman herself is "fled into the wilderness, where she hath a place prepared of God, that they should feed her there a thousand two hundred and threescore days." (12:6)

Then there is a description of "War in Heaven" of the angels against the dragon, and "the great dragon was cast out, that old serpent, called the Devil, and Satan, which deceiveth the whole world: he was cast out into the earth, and his angels were cast out with him." (12:9)

The woman is again mentioned in 12:13, as she is persecuted by the dragon, and she escapes on her "two wings of a great eagle" (12:14).
The dragon attempts to inundate her place of refuge, by "water as a flood" emerging from his mouth (12:15), but the flood is swallowed up by the earth (12:16), so the dragon went "to make war with the remnant of her seed, which keep the commandments of God, and have the testimony of Jesus Christ" (12:17).

Gallery

Interpretation as the Virgin Mary

History
Ancient witnesses to the Marian interpretation include St. Epiphanius, Tychonius (who heavily influenced St. Augustine), the unknown author of the History of Joseph the Carpenter, Quodvultdeus (a disciple of St. Augustine), Cassiodorus (Complexiones in Apocalypsi, written c. 570 AD), and the Greek Fathers Andreas of Caesarea (late 6th c. / early 7th c.) and Oikoumenios (6th c.).

In modern times, the Marian interpretation has been affirmed by Pope Pius X,
Pope Pius XII,
Pope Paul VI, and Pope John Paul II.

Theological interpretation
The woman's "male child" is a reference to Jesus (Revelation 12:5), since he is destined to "rule all nations with a rod of iron" (Revelation 12:5). The dragon trying to devour the woman's child at the moment of his birth (Revelation 12:4) is a reference to Herod the Great's attempt to kill the infant Jesus (Matthew 2:16). Through his death and resurrection and Ascension, Jesus "was snatched up to God and to his throne" (Revelation 12:5).

In the interpretation of Pius X (1904), the birth is not that of Jesus but "surely ours", (i.e. the Church Militant) "we who, being yet detained in exile, are still to be brought forth to the perfect love of God and eternal happiness". Pius XII (1950) makes explicit the reference to the Assumption of Mary.
And John Paul II (1987) to the Protoevangelium interpretation of Genesis 3:15, and by extension the symbolic identification of the Woman with both Mary and Eve.

For an assessment of the logical and theological reasons for identifying the Woman of Revelation 12 with Mary Mother of God, see , Raised to Heaven because Co-Redemptrix on Earth. Thoughts on the Foundation of the Catholic Dogma (2012) and D'Argon J-L, "The Apocalypse" in The Jerome Biblical Commentary (1968).

Alternatively,  extreme pain in childbirth is seen as a result of the fall by many and the woman has extreme pain in child birth which may cause some tension with a sinless Mary interpretation of the text is an issue to consider.  Dr. Mark Miravalle teacher of General Mariology in Mary's Virginity During the Birth of Jesus: The Catholic Church's Perennial Tradition.

Also alternatively, some would make the woman Israel and/or the church since in one dream of Joseph's in Genesis of his father and mother being the sun and moon and his brothers in Gen 37:9.

Veneration
Both Marian veneration and the interpretation of the Woman of the Apocalypse are recorded since at least the 4th century, but the specific veneration of Mary in this form becomes tangible only in the medieval period. Iconographically, Marian figures associated with the Revelation narrative are recognizable by the astronomical attributes, specifically her standing on a crescent moon, and the crown of twelve stars (while the description "clothed with the sun" is sometimes rendered by rays emanating from her figure).

Association of Mary with a single star is recorded from the early medieval period, in the hymn Ave Maris Stella.

Many depictions of Mary from the Gothic period (14th to 16th century) show her standing on a crescent moon inspired by the association of Mary with the woman of the Apocalypse. The motif became so popular in 15th-century Germany that pre-existing Madonna figures were refitted with a crescent (e.g. Madonna of Bad Doberan, c. 1300, refitted in the 15th century).
The Virgin of Guadalupe was depicted as the Madonna of the Apocalypse since at least the 16th century.

The Madonna of the Apocalypse became associated with Our Lady of the Rosary, the "crown of twelve stars" being identified with a "rosary of twelve privileges" of Mary. The Virgin of the Rosary is frequently shown with the crown or halo of twelve stars (but not the crescent moon) in modern depictions (since the 19th century). A notable example is the Virgin of the Rosary of Pompei.

An anecdote (first published in the 1980s) connects the design of the Flag of Europe (1955) to this aspect of Marian iconography.

Interpretation as the Church
One early witness to the interpretation of the woman as the church is Hippolytus of Rome who states said interpretation in On Christ and Antichrist.

The Catholic Church recognizes the "woman" as part of the polyvalent symbolism that is found in the book in four referents: Israel, the Church, Eve, and Mary.

Commentators who adhere to Protestant theology in their eschatology sometimes identify the woman as the Church, and the man-child she gives birth to are the saints. According to this interpretation, Revelation 12:17 describes the remnant of the seed of the woman as those who keep the commandments of God, and have the testimony of Jesus Christ. The offspring of the Woman, the Woman's seed, then refers to the saints. The man child "who shall rule the nations with a rod of iron" is a symbol of the faithful members of the Church.

In Revelation 2:18–29, the Church in Thyatira is promised that the faithful shall rule the nations with a rod of iron. In Revelation 19:15 the same thing is stated of Jesus. In Galatians 4:26, Paul the Apostle refers to the "New Jerusalem" as "our mother", and in Revelation 21:2 and Ephesians 5:21–32 the New Jerusalem and the Church is portrayed as the Bride of Christ.

The Seventh-day Adventist Church identifies itself as the end-time "remnant church" described in Revelation 12:17.

The Church of Jesus Christ of Latter-day Saints also interprets the woman to be the Church, and the man-child to be the political kingdom that will grow out of the Church prior to or during the Second Coming of Christ; this interpretation arises from Joseph Smith's translation of the twelfth chapter of Revelation. Some in the church interpret the woman to be a symbol of the earth. Baptisms of fire and water being poured upon the earth and the sun clothing the earth daily are just a couple examples of this reference.

Other interpretations

The Bahá'í Faith
The Bahá'í Faith interprets the woman as representing the religion of God as revealed within Islam, with the governments of the Persian Empire (the sun) and Ottoman Empire (the moon) under its influence "for the emblem of Persia is the sun and that of the Ottoman Empire is the crescent moon." They identify the crown of twelve stars on her head as the Twelve Imams of Islam who promoted the religion and were "the educators of the nation, and who shone as stars in the heaven of guidance." Bahá'í Faith recognizes the child she bears after a period of 1,260 days to rule all nations with a rod of iron to be the Báb, the forerunner of the Bahá'í Faith, who declared his mission in 1844 – the year 1260 in the Islamic lunar calendar.

The Nation of Israel
Dispensational Premillennialists, and Amillennialists who believe in multiple valid interpretations will often identify the woman as the nation of Israel. There are several reasons given to support this interpretation. The woman is said to be clothed with the sun, the moon under her feet, and twelve stars. These symbols are drawn from Genesis 37:9–11, in which Joseph has a dream of the sun and moon symbolizing his father and mother, and stars representing his eleven brothers, which bow down to him. The Old Testament's prophets referred to Israel as a "woman" (Isaiah 54:5–6; Jeremiah 4:31; Micah 4:9–10).

The woman flees into the wilderness where she is nourished for 1260 days, the equivalent of three and a half years or forty-two months (cf. Rev. 12:6). According to this interpretation, these terms are used prophetically in Scripture either for the first half or the last half of the "Seventieth Week of Daniel", in Daniel 9:24–27, a prophecy specifically addressed to Daniel and his people, Israel (Dan. 9:24).

In the latter part of the seventieth week, a remnant of Israel will flee into the wilderness to escape the persecution of Antichrist, who is called "the son of destruction", "the lawless one", and "whose coming is in accord with the activity of Satan" (2 Thess. 2:1–12; cf. Rev. 12:4,9). Jesus, in the Olivet discourse, warned the people of this time which would occur just prior to His return to set up His earthly, Millennial kingdom (Matt. 24:15–22). Further, the archangel Michael is called the guardian over the sons of Israel in Dan. 12:1. And he will arise at that time of national Israel's tribulation (Dan. 12:1; cf. Rev. 12:7).

Amillennialist belief can also interpret this passage as the nation of Israel, however this belief as expressed by amillennialists refers, not to the modern Israel, but to the Ancient religious state of Israel(Judea) as it existed in the time of Christ. The Child is Christ, born into the then existing state of Israel, and of Israel's lineage.

The remnant or sons of Israel is, in this understanding, the followers of Christ, the followers of the true religion of Israel as it exists after the coming of the messiah. The "Seventieth Week of Daniel", and prophecy of the Olivet discourse, in this belief, are ascribed as concerning the first coming of Christ, the destruction of Jerusalem in 70 AD (during which enforced emperor worship occurred in the temple of Jerusalem, which was later almost totally destroyed, and many Jews were made slaves in distant lands resulting presumably in their remaining families not knowing what happened to them or where they were), and the establishment of Christ's Church, as it currently exists, both on earth and in heaven.

Lutheran scholar Craig Koester, for example, says, "The woman encompasses the story of Israel, from whom the Messiah was born, as well as the story of the church, which was persecuted after Jesus' death and resurrection... John's visionary account of the threat against the woman and the woman's preservation uses imagery that encompasses many moments in the story of God's people. This allows the story to apply to people in many times and places."

Astrological symbolism
Russian Orthodox theologian Sergei Bulgakov (1871–1944) in his interpretation of Revelation notes of the astronomical attributes of the woman in Babylonian, Persian, Greek, and Egyptian mythologies. He takes the crown of twelve stars as representing the Zodiac. In his interpretation, astronomical attributes of a pagan goddess are here "translated into the language of Christian theology and assume the new symbolism.

The Church of Jesus Christ of Latter-day Saints
In Joseph Smith's Inspired Translation of the King James Bible (JST), the woman is identified as "the church of God":
"And the woman fled into the wilderness, where she had a place prepared of God, that they should feed her there a thousand two hundred and threescore days. And there was war in heaven; Michael and his angels fought against the dragon; and the dragon and his angels fought against Michael; And the dragon prevailed not against Michael, neither the child, nor the woman which was the church of God, who had been delivered of her pains, and brought forth the kingdom of our God and his Christ. (Revelation 12:1–17 JST)

Christian Science
Science and Health with Key to the Scriptures (1875) written by Mary Baker Eddy, the founder of The First Church of Christ, Scientist, presents the woman in the Apocalypse as symbolizing "the spiritual idea of God; she illustrates the coincidence of God and man as the divine Principle and divine idea ... the spiritual idea of God's motherhood." The man child represents "Christ, God's idea, [which] will eventually rule all nations and peoples – imperatively, absolutely, finally – with divine Science [the Law of God]"

See also
 
 
 Consecration of Russia
 Civic heraldry

References

Notes

Citations

Sources

External links

 Chivalric precursors to St. George and the Dragon, 14 images under Wikimedia:Virgin and Serpent
 Immaculata as Radiation of Fatherhood  126 images under Wikimedia:Mondsickelmadonna
 Scriptural parturition imagery of Revelation chapter 12, 24 images under Wikimedia:Woman of the Apocalypse
 Eastern icon of the type Matka Boska Ostrobramska – 28 images Our Lady of the Gate of Dawn at the Eastern Gate, Vilnius, Lithuania

Book of Revelation
Catholic Mariology
Christian terminology
Marian apparitions
Michael (archangel)
Our Lady of Guadalupe
Titles of Mary
Virgin Mary in art
Women in the New Testament